Anamaria is a feminine given name. Notable people with the name include:

Anamaria Ioniță (born 1988), Romanian athlete
Anamaria Marinca (born 1978), Romanian actress
Anamaria Nesteriuc (born 1993), Romanian hurdler
Anamaria Ocolișan (born 1997), Romanian artistic gymnast
Anamaria Tămârjan (born 1991), Romanian artistic gymnast
Anamaria Vartolomei (born 1999), French-Romanian actress

Fictional characters
Anamaria, a character in the film Pirates of the Caribbean: The Curse of the Black Pearl

See also
Ana María (1929–1983), Salvadoran revolutionary
Annamaria
Anna Maria (disambiguation)

Romanian feminine given names